Vaskess Bay is a large bay which extends along the southwest coast of Kiritimati Island in Kiribati.

References

Bodies of water of Kiribati